Kazimierz Piontkowski (Kazymyr Piontkovskyi; b.  — d. 10 August 1938) was a former Soviet and Ukrainian football player, central midfielder.

Piontkowski was a friend of Sergei Barminskiy who is considered one of the founders of Dynamo Kyiv. Both of them were executed in 1938.

According to journalist Borys Halynskyi, at the end of 1920s the Kiev newspaper "Verchirniy Kyiv" called Piontkowski the "soul of the team".

In 1932 Piontkowski debuted for the Soviet Union national football team in a home game against the Germany Workers' Team winning 3:2.

On 14 October 1937 Piontkowski was arrested by UGB UNKVD (KGB) in Khabarovsk. On 18 July 1938 he was convicted by the USSR NKVD according to the Article 58-1a of the Russian SFSR Penal Code ("treason of the Motherland"). Piontkowski was executed by a firing squad a month later on 10 August 1938 in Khabarovsk.

On 30 June 1989 Piontkowski was rehabilitated on a conclusion of the Military Prosecutor's Office of the Red Banner Far Eastern Military District (KDVO) according to the Supreme Soviet Presidium of the Soviet Union (PVS USSR) ukase of 16 January 1989.

Honours
 Odessa Championship
 Winners (1): 1925
 Soviet Union Dynamiade
 Runners-up (1): 1929
 Ukraine Dynamiade
 Winners (1): 1931
 Runners-up (2): 1929, 1932
 Ukraine championship among cities
 Winners (1): 1931
 Runners-up (1): 1934

References

External links
 

1903 births
1938 deaths
Sportspeople from Warsaw
People from Warsaw Governorate
Soviet people of Polish descent
Ukrainian people of Polish descent
Association football forwards
Soviet footballers
Ukrainian footballers
FC Shkirtrest Odessa players
FC Dynamo Kyiv players
Executed people from Masovian Voivodeship
People executed by the Soviet Union by firing squad
Great Purge victims from Poland
Soviet rehabilitations